Ivory Coast (also known as Côte d'Ivoire, its official IOC name) has sent athletes to all Summer Olympic Games held since 1964 except for 1980 which it boycotted in protest of the Soviet invasion of Afghanistan.  The country first won a silver medal in the men's 400 metres in 1984.  In 2016, the country won its first gold and bronze medals in Taekwondo.  No athletes from Côte d'Ivoire have competed in any Winter Olympic Games.

Medal tables

Medals by Summer Games

Medals by sport

List of medalists

See also
 List of flag bearers for Ivory Coast at the Olympics

External links